Billy Timmins (born 1 October 1959) is an Irish politician. He was a Teachta Dála (TD) for the Wicklow constituency from 1997 until the 2016 general election. He was the deputy leader of Renua from the foundation of the party in March 2015 until May 2016. He previously sat as an independent TD, having lost the Fine Gael parliamentary party whip in July 2013.

Timmins was born in Baltinglass, County Wicklow. He was educated at Patrician College, Ballyfin, County Laois; at University College Galway where he received a Bachelor of Arts degree in Economics and Legal Science; and at the Military College, Curragh. Timmins served as an army officer, serving in Galway, Donegal and Kilkenny and with the United Nations in Lebanon and Cyprus.

Timmins was first elected to Dáil Éireann for the Wicklow constituency at the 1997 general election, succeeding his father Godfrey Timmins who had retired. On his election to the Dáil, he became party spokesperson on Defence, Peacekeeping and Humanitarian Relief. He was elected to Wicklow County Council for the Baltinglass area in 1999 and served until 2004. In 2000 he became party spokesperson on Housing.

Following the 2002 general election he was appointed spokesperson on Agriculture and Food. In Enda Kenny's front bench reshuffle in 2004 he received the Defence spokesperson portfolio. He was party spokesperson on Foreign Affairs from 2007 to 2010. In June 2010 he supported Richard Bruton's leadership challenge to Enda Kenny. Following Kenny's victory in a motion of confidence, Timmins was not re-appointed to the front bench. From October 2010 to March 2011 he was party deputy spokesperson on Social Protection with special responsibility for Pension and Welfare Reform.

Timmins was expelled from the Fine Gael parliamentary party on 2 July 2013 when he defied the party whip by voting against the Protection of Life During Pregnancy Bill 2013. On 13 September 2013 he and six other expellees formed the Reform Alliance, most of whose supporters moved on to its successor Renua Ireland. He stood as a Renua candidate at the 2016 general election, but lost his seat. In May 2016, he announced his resignation from Renua.

Timmins rejoined the Fine Gael party in April 2018 and on 11 May 2018 was selected, along with Andrew Doyle and Simon Harris, to be a Fine Gael candidate for Wicklow for the next general election. He was an unsuccessful Fine Gael candidate for the Wicklow constituency at the 2020 general election.

See also
Families in the Oireachtas

References

 

1959 births
Living people
Alumni of the University of Galway
Fine Gael TDs
Independent TDs
Irish Anglicans
Irish Army officers
Local councillors in County Wicklow
Members of the 28th Dáil
Members of the 29th Dáil
Members of the 30th Dáil
Members of the 31st Dáil
Politicians from County Wicklow
Renua Ireland TDs